Mean What You Say is an album by the Thad Jones/Pepper Adams Quintet recorded in 1966 and released on the Milestone label.

Reception

Scott Yanow of Allmusic called the band a "high-quality hard bop unit" and stated "Jones and Adams always made for a potent team, but the rise of the Thad Jones/Mel Lewis Orchestra meant that this particular quintet only lasted a short time".

Track listing 
All compositions by Thad Jones except where noted.
 "Mean What You Say" – 4:36
 "H and T Blues" – 7:42
 "Wives and Lovers" (Burt Bacharach, Hal David) – 4:55
 "Bossa Nova Ova" – 3:23
 "No Refill" – 4:38
 "Little Waltz" (Ron Carter) – 6:30
 "Chant" (Duke Pearson) – 5:20
 "Yes Sir, That's My Baby" (Walter Donaldson, Gus Kahn) – 4:06

Personnel 
Thad Jones- flugelhorn
Pepper Adams – baritone saxophone
Duke Pearson – piano
Ron Carter – bass
Mel Lewis – drums

References 

Thad Jones albums
Pepper Adams albums
1966 albums
Milestone Records albums
Albums produced by Orrin Keepnews